Leasburg is a former town and the former county seat of Caswell County, North Carolina,  United States. The community has a partial presence in Person County. The population was 1,662 at the 2010 census. It was named in honor of longtime resident William Lea and is located along US 158 and NC 119 near Hyco Lake. Leasburg is also the name of a Caswell County township.

History
When Caswell County was created in 1777, the area that would become Leasburg was named as the county seat; however, a county courthouse was not built on the site until 1784, after the American Revolutionary War. When the area around the courthouse began to develop, the community decided to incorporate. The town of Leasburg was officially recognized by the North Carolina General Assembly in 1788. When the eastern section of Caswell County split and became Person County, a more geographically central location for the Caswell county seat was needed; so, in 1792 the courthouse was moved to an area which became known as "Caswell Court House", which later changed its name to Yanceyville. Leasburg continued to develop after the courthouse relocation and eventually became known as the regional center for education. Numerous mills, factories, and farms prospered in the town until competition nearby from Durham doomed the area's tobacco industry. The Civil War left Leasburg in ruin, although many antebellum residences still remain.

Famous former residents of Leasburg include Solomon Lea, the son of William Lea and the first president of Greensboro College, and Jacob Thompson, who served under President James Buchanan as Secretary of the Interior. Leasburg was also the birthplace of the short-lived Piedmont blues musician, Carolina Slim.

The Garland-Buford House and James Malone House are listed on the National Register of Historic Places.

Caswell County Speedway 
Caswell County Speedway was once in operation in Leasburg and offered dirt track kart racing. The 1/5 mile track's ruins are still present and can be seen from Solomon Lea Road.

Nearby communities and municipalities
Yanceyville
Milton
Prospect Hill
Roxboro
Semora

References

External links
 Leasburg History
 Leasburg Architecture

Populated places in Caswell County, North Carolina
Populated places in Person County, North Carolina
Unincorporated communities in North Carolina
Populated places established in 1777
Former county seats in North Carolina